Loaded, Leather, Moonroof is the title of a recording by Canadian guitarist Don Ross, released in 1997. Ross plays 6 and 7-string guitar and dobro on this release.

Track listing
All songs by Don Ross except as noted.

 "Loaded, Leather, Moonroof"
 "Meanwhile Road"
 "Jesse Helms' Night in Havana"
 "Sweet Sister"
 "Carolan's Quarrel With the Landlady/Michael and Juliana"
 "Jerry's Front Porch"
 "Can't Find My Way Home"
 "Wave From Your WIndow"
 "Bruyere"
 "Meanwhile Road (reprise)"

Personnel
Don Ross – guitar

Don Ross (guitarist) albums
1997 albums